A constitutional referendum was held in the unrecognised republic of Nagorno-Karabakh on 10 December 2006 to approve a draft constitution, which defined Nagorno-Karabakh as a sovereign state. Azerbaijan condemned the referendum, saying it is an unconstitutional attempt to damage the peace process. 

The constitution was approved by 99.28% of voters, with a turnout of 87%.

Results

See also
 1991 Nagorno-Karabakh independence referendum

References

2006
2006 referendums
2006 in international relations
2006 in the Nagorno-Karabakh Republic
Constitutional referendums